The crested gecko or eyelash gecko (Correlophus ciliatus) is a species of gecko native to southern New Caledonia. In 1866, the crested gecko was described by French zoologist Alphonse Guichenot. This species was thought to be extinct until it was rediscovered in 1994 during an expedition led by Robert Seipp. Along with several other New Caledonian gecko species, it is being considered for protected status by the Convention on the International Trade in Endangered Species of Wild Flora and Fauna.

Taxonomy
The species was first described in 1866 as Correlophus ciliatus by the Alphone Guichenot in an article entitled "Notice sur un nouveau genre de sauriens de la famille des geckotiens du Muséum de Paris" ("Notes on a new species of lizard in the gecko family") in the Mémoires de la Société Scientifique Naturelle de Chérbourg. 

It was later renamed Rhacodactylus ciliatus. Recent phylogenetic analysis indicates that R. ciliatus and R. sarasinorum are not closely related to the other giant geckos, so these two species have been reclassified from Rhacodactylus back to the genus Correlophus.

The specific name, ciliatus, is Latin, from cilia ("fringe" or "eyelashes") and refers to the crest of skin over the animal's eyes that resembles eyelashes.

Distribution and habitat 

The crested gecko is endemic to South Province, New Caledonia. There are three disjunct populations, one found on the Isle of Pines and surrounding islets, and there are two populations found on the main island of Grande Terre. One population is around the Blue River, which is a protected provincial park, and the other is further north, just south of Mount Dzumac. They are seen around many tropical climates.

Physical description

Among the most distinctive features of these geckos are the hair-like projections found above the eyes, which greatly resemble eyelashes. This projections continue as two rows of spines that run from the eyes to the sides of their wedge-shaped head and continue to the base of their tail. Crested geckos do not have eyelids. Instead, a transparent scale, or spectacle, keeps each eye moist, and the geckos use their tongues to clear away debris.

These geckos possess a semi-prehensile tail which they use to assist in climbing. The tail can be dropped (via caudal autotomy) to distract predators. Crested geckos do not regenerate their tails once lost; most adults in the wild lack tails.

The toes and the tip of the semi-prehensile tail are covered in small hairs called setae. Each seta is divided into hundreds of smaller (approximately 200 nanometres in diameter) hairs called spatulae. It is believed these structures exploit the weak van der Waals force to help the gecko climb on most solid surfaces, most easily on flatter, smoother surfaces such as glass or wood. The toes have small claws which aid in climbing surfaces to which their toes cannot cling.

The crested gecko has many naturally occurring color groups, including grey, brown, red, orange, and yellow of various shades. They have three color morphs in the wild, which include pattern-less, white-fringed, and tiger.

Ecology and behavior 
Crested geckos are a mostly arboreal species, preferring to inhabit the canopy of the New Caledonia rainforests. They are able to jump long distances between branches to move to new locations. Crested geckos are nocturnal, and will generally spend the daylight hours sleeping in secure spots in high branches. Crested geckos are omnivores, and will opportunistically feed on fruit, nectar, pollen, and a variety of insects.

Crested geckos were believed to be extinct prior to rediscovery in 1994. The species is currently being assessed for CITES protection and vulnerable status. The biggest single threat to the wild population appears to be the introduction of the little fire ant (Wassmania auropunctata) to New Caledonia. The ants prey on the geckos, stinging and attacking in very large numbers, and they also compete with the geckos for food by preying on arthropods. Other threats to the wild population include habitat damage from wildfires, rodent predation, and habitat degradation from introduced deer and pigs.

Reproduction

Little is known about the wild reproductive behavior of crested geckos; available information has been obtained from captive animals. Females generally lay two eggs per clutch, which hatch 60–150 days after they are laid. A female crested gecko only has to mate with a male once in order to lay 2 eggs every 4–6 weeks for a breeding cycle of upwards of 8–10 months. After a breeding cycle females in the wild go through a "cooling" cycle, usually prompted by slight temperature and daylight changes over the winter season. During this time, the females are able to regain the body mass and nutrients they lost during egg-laying.

Crested geckos have two small sacs for calcium on the roof of their mouths. If an egg-laying female does not have enough calcium her sac will be depleted, and she can suffer from calcium deficiency. This can lead to a calcium crash, where the female appears shaky or wobbly, lethargic, has a lack of appetite, and can even result in death.

Newly hatched crested geckos will generally not eat until after they have shed and eaten their skin for the first time, relying on the remains of their yolk sack for nutrition.

As a pet

Though the export of wild crested geckos is now prohibited, biologists exported several specimens for breeding and study before New Caledonia stopped issuing permits to export the species. From these specimens, different breeding lines were established, both in Europe and the United States. The crested gecko is now one of the most widely-kept and bred species of gecko in the world, second only to the common leopard gecko.

Crested geckos can be very long-lived. While they have not been kept in captivity long enough for a definitive life span to be determined, they have been kept for 15–20 years or more.

References

External links

 Bauer, Aaron M. & Sadlier, Ross A. 2000 The Herpetofauna of New Caledonia. Society for the Study of Amphibians and Reptiles. 
 Crested Gecko Care Sheet REPTILES Magazine

Correlophus
Geckos of New Caledonia
Endemic fauna of New Caledonia
Reptiles described in 1866
Taxa named by Alphonse Guichenot
Reptiles as pets